Victoria Bridge is a single track railway truss bridge located in Karai, Kuala Kangsar District, Perak, Malaysia. It is one of the oldest railway bridges in the country, having been constructed between December 1897 and March 1900 by the Perak Government Railway as a crossing over the Perak River to serve the local tin mining industry. The bridge was officially opened by the late Almarhum DYMM Sultan Idris Murshidul Adzam Shah I the Sultan of Perak at that time.

Starting in 1992, Victoria Bridge was managed by Railway Assets Corporation. The Railway Assets Corporation (RAC) is a federal statutory body under the Ministry of Transport. It was established under the Railways Act 1991 (Act 463) through Government Gazette No.16 Volume 36 on July 30, 1992. https://www.rac.gov.my/index.php/pages/view/1

The Victoria Bridge remained in use until 2002, when a wider concrete girder bridge built parallel to the old bridge was completed to take over the role of handling rail traffic. The new bridge is significantly wider, with room to support a second track, but in its early life it was only required to handle a single track until double tracking and electrification was conducted between the Ipoh-Padang Besar line during the late-2000s and early-2010s.

While the old bridge is closed to rail traffic, its adjoining footbridge is still publicly open to motorcycles and pedestrians. Attempts have been made to retain the structure, with occasional maintenance having been conducted on it. The Victoria Bridge has become a minor tourist attraction, with signage set up to inform visitors about its history. It is a popular spot for photoshoots.

Gallery

External links
 FORGOTTEN BRIDGE, an illustrated explanation of the Victoria Bridge.

Kuala Kangsar District
Railway bridges in Malaysia
Bridges completed in 1900
Former railway bridges